Omar Mahmood Fateh, is a Minnesota politician and a member of the Minnesota Senate. A member of the Minnesota Democratic Farmer-Labor Party (DFL), he represents District 62, which includes parts of south Minneapolis in Hennepin County. Fateh is the first Somali American and Muslim to serve in the Minnesota Senate.

Early life and education
Fateh was born in Washington, D.C., and is the son of immigrants from Somalia. He graduated from Falls Church High School and earned undergraduate and graduate degrees from George Mason University.

Minnesota Senate
Fateh was an unsuccessful candidate for District 62A of the Minnesota House of Representatives in 2018. In 2020, he announced a primary challenge to incumbent Senator Jeff Hayden. A self-declared democratic socialist, Fateh received support from groups such as the Democratic Socialists of America and the Sunrise Movement. He also received the Minnesota Democratic-Farmer-Labor Party's endorsement. Fateh defeated Hayden in the August primary, 54% to 45%, and was elected to the Minnesota Senate with 88.99% of the vote in the general election.

Investigations
Since Father took office, local media have reported his ties to two controversies. The first investigation found the Fateh campaign received $11,000 in donations from 11 donors also tied to the Feeding Our Future scandal. 

The second incident stemmed from a State Senate Ethics investigation. Fateh failed to disclose $1,000 his campaign paid to Somali TV Minnesota, and the incident was referred to the Minnesota Campaign Finance Board. A second complaint was related to the perjury conviction of Muse Mohamed, Fateh’s brother-in-law and a volunteer on his 2020 campaign. A federal jury convicted Muse in May of lying to a federal grand jury about his handling of three absentee ballots for Fateh’s campaign.

Personal life
Fateh lives in Minneapolis's Phillips neighborhood.

See also
List of Democratic Socialists of America who have held office in the United States

References 

American politicians of Somalian descent
Minnesota socialists
Democratic Socialists of America politicians from Minnesota
Democratic Party Minnesota state senators
Living people
Politicians from Minneapolis
Politicians from Washington, D.C.
1990 births
African-American Muslims
American people of Somali descent